Dysschema neda is a moth of the family Erebidae first described by Johann Christoph Friedrich Klug in 1936. It is found in Brazil.

References

Dysschema
Arctiinae of South America